Banat Bulgarian (Banat Bulgarian: Palćena balgarsćija jázić or Banátsća balgarsćija jázić; ; ; ; ; , Banatski bugarski jezik) is the outermost dialect of the Bulgarian language with standardized writing and an old literary tradition. It is spoken by the Banat Bulgarians in the Banat region, in Romania and Serbia. Officially, it is spoken by 8,000 people (1,658 in Serbia, and 6,500 in Romania), though other estimates give numbers up to 15,000.

In 1998, Jáni Vasilčin from Dudeştii Vechi translated the New Testament into Banat Bulgarian: Svetotu Pismu Novija Zákun. In 2017 Ána Marijka Bodor published  a Banat Bulgarian translation of Antoine de Saint-Exupéry's Little Prince.

Origins 

The Banat Bulgarians are predominantly Roman Catholic people. Their ancestors arrived in the region centuries ago from Northern Bulgaria after the failure of the Chiprovtsi uprising. They settled in Oltenia under the Wallachian prince, then when Oltenia fell to the Ottomans, they fled to Hungary. The ancestor of the Banat Bulgarian language is the Paulician dialect, member of the Rup dialect group.

History 

In the 1740s, Blasius Hristofor instituted the first school in Dudeştii Vechi in which Banat Bulgarian was taught using the Latin script. Some Bulgarian priests of the time already used the Latin alphabet, banned by the bishops. In the 19th century, the group's national consciousness strengthened and more Banat books were written.

In the 19th century, Banat Bulgarian schools used the Illyrian-Slavic language. In the course of using Illyrian-Slavic, more Slovenisms entered the language.

The Hungarian Imre Berecz and the Croatian András Klobucsár wrote a few books in their mother tongue. Berecz wrote a catechism in Banat Bulgarian (1851). Klobucsár designed a prayer- and hymn-book. One of the teachers, János Uzun, also wrote secular verses. In 1866, József Rill standardised the Banat Bulgarian language and published Balgarsku právupisanj (Bulgarian Orthography).

The Balgarsku právupisanj was used to design coursebooks in Banat Bulgarian, including an ABC book and reader, together with Biblijata  and Gulemija Kátaæizmus. Teacher Leopold Koszilkov was also translating Gospels. Fránc Glász and the German Ludovik Fischer wrote a prayer-book. This were notable works notables in Banat Bulgarian literature, as were very popular. The prayerbooks contain prayers, hymns and the biographies of saints. Koszilkov published calendars.

Banat Bulgarians retained their language. Romanian and Serbian were used in schools, but in the catechisms henceforward Banat Bulgarian was used.

Linguistic features 
The vernacular of the Bulgarians of Banat can be classified as a Paulician dialect of the Eastern Bulgarian group. A typical feature is the "ы" (*y) vowel, which can either take an etymological place or replace "i". Other characteristic phonological features are the "ê" (wide "e") reflex of the Old Church Slavonic yat and the reduction of "o" into "u" and sometimes "e" into "i": puljé instead of pole ("field"), sélu instead of selo ("village"), ugništi instead of ognište ("fireplace"). Another feature is the palatalization of final consonants, which is typical for other Slavic languages but found only in some nonstandard dialects of Bulgarian (in such dialects the word den ("day") sounds like denj) and not in standard Bulgarian.

Lexically, the language has borrowed many words from languages such as German (drot from Draht, "wire"; gáng from Gang, "anteroom, corridor"), Hungarian (vilánj from villany, "electricity"; mozi, "cinema"), Serbian (stvár from stvar, "item, matter"; ráčun from račun, "account"), and Romanian (šedinca from şedinţă, "conference") due to the close contacts with the other peoples of the multiethnic Banat and the religious ties with other Roman Catholic peoples. Banat Bulgarian also has some older loanwords from Ottoman Turkish and Greek, which it shares with other Bulgarian dialects (e.g. hirgjén from Turkish ergen, "unmarried man, bachelor"; trandáfer from Greek τριαντάφυλλο triantafyllo, "rose"). Loanwords constitute around 20% of the Banat Bulgarian vocabulary. The names of some Banat Bulgarians are also influenced by Hungarian names, as the Hungarian (eastern) name order is sometimes used (family name followed by given name) and the female ending "-a" is often dropped from family names. Thus, Marija Velčova would become Velčov Marija.

In addition to loanwords, the lexicon of Banat Bulgarian has also acquired calques and neologisms, such as svetica ("icon", formerly used ikona and influenced by German Heiligenbild), zarno ("bullet", from the word meaning "grain"), oganbalváč ("volcano", literally "fire belcher"), and predhurta ("foreword").

The Banat Bulgarian language has its own alphabet largely based on the Serbo-Croatian Gaj's Latin alphabet and preserves many features that are archaic in the language spoken in Bulgaria.  Banat Bulgarian was codified as early as 1866 and is used in literature and the media, which distinguishes it from other Bulgarian dialects.

Alphabet 
The following is the Banat Bulgarian Latin alphabet:

Examples

References

Footnotes

External links 
 SVETA UD PUKRAJ NÁMU
 Virtuálna Biblioteka
 UBBR - Sájta na palćenete

Bulgarian language
Languages of Romania
Languages of Serbia
South Slavic languages